Darr Creek is a rural locality in the Western Downs Region, Queensland, Australia. In the  Darr Creek had a population of 18 people.

Darr Creek's postcode is 4410.

Geography 
The locality is bounded to the east by Craig Range (part of the Great Dividing Range).

Millingwood is a neighbourhood in the south-east of the locality.

The Chinchilla–Wondai Road (State Route 82) runs through from south to north.

History 
The locality takes its name from creek on the old Darr pastoral run held by Thorne and Ridler during the early 1850s.

Darr Creek State School opened on 26 April 1922 and closed in May 1961. The school was at 6389 Chinchilla Wondai Road (formerly known as the Condamine Highway).

Millingwood Provisional School opened on 4 May 1937 and closed on 1952. It was on Millingwood Road at approx .

In the  Darr Creek had a population of 18 people.

References 

Western Downs Region
Localities in Queensland